Suleiman Mirza (b. 28 March 1554, Nakhchivan – d. 30 October 1576) was a Safavid prince. The son of king Tahmasp I (r. 1524–1576) by his Circassian wife Sultan-Agha Khanum, he functioned several years as an official, serving as the governor (hakem) of Shiraz (1555–1557/58, under a laleh) and Mashhad (1567–1573, under a laleh as well). His full sister was Pari Khan Khanum, and his Circassian uncle Shamkhal Sultan – both extremely pivotal figures in Safavid affairs during the latter half of the 16th century. 

During the last few years of Tahmasp I's life, when a protracted competition for the throne was evident, as well as much jockeying for position by the rival factions, a number of Qizilbash chiefs decided, in 1574, to openly support Suleiman Mirza as heir apparent. When his half-brother Ismail Mirza Safavi (who succeeded as Ismail II) was eventually enthroned on 22 August 1576, the latter ordered for the systematic murder or blinding of any prince of royal blood who could become the center of a conspiracy against him. As a result, Suleiman Mirza was killed on 30 October 1576 by the order of his own half-brother. He was buried at the Shrine of Imamzadeh Hossein in Qazvin, the then royal capital.

References

Sources
 
  
 
 

1554 births
1576 deaths
Iranian people of Circassian descent
Governors of Fars
Safavid governors
Safavid governors of Mashhad
Safavid princes
People executed by Safavid Iran
Executed royalty
People from Nakhchivan
16th-century people of Safavid Iran
Fratricides